José Julio González Garza (born 2 April 1956) is a Mexican business administrator, economist and specialist in political science.

Early life 
He studied at the Autonomous University of Mexico (UNAM).

Career 
He first affiliated with the National Action Party. As of 2014 he served as Deputy of the LIX Legislature of the Mexican Congress as a plurinominal representative. He became the local Congressman for the state of Guanajuato by popular election in the LX Legislature, President of the Comicion of Finance and the Superior oversight. He was the major driver of a silver coin for Mexico .

References

1956 births
Living people
Politicians from Guanajuato
People from León, Guanajuato
Members of the Chamber of Deputies (Mexico)
National Action Party (Mexico) politicians
21st-century Mexican politicians
Deputies of the LIX Legislature of Mexico